Sir Peter John Cresswell, DL (born 24 April 1944) is an English former High Court judge, and currently a judge of the Qatar International Court and Dispute Resolution Centre.

Cresswell was educated at St John's School, Leatherhead before studying law at Queens' College, Cambridge from 1962 to 1965, gaining an MA and LLB.  He was then called to the bar at Gray's Inn in 1966. Cresswell was appointed Queen's Counsel in 1983 before being appointed a High Court Judge in 1991 where he was assigned to the Queens' Bench Division. From 1993-94 he was the judge in charge of the commercial court. Between 1993 and 1996 Creswell presided over the Lloyds litigation, the largest piece of civil litigation in the UK.

Cresswell retired from the High Court in 2008 and since 2009 has been a judge of the Grand Court of the Cayman Islands.

In November 2014 he was made a Companion of The Academy of Experts.

He is a Deputy Lieutenant of Hampshire and a Bencher of Gray's Inn.

References

1944 births
Living people
Alumni of Queens' College, Cambridge
Deputy Lieutenants of Hampshire
Queen's Bench Division judges
Knights Bachelor
Members of Gray's Inn
People educated at St John's School, Leatherhead